State Route 223 (SR 223) is a  route that serves as a connection between Union Springs in Bullock County with Banks in Pike County .

Route description
The southern terminus of SR 223 is located at its intersection with US 29 to the northwest of Banks. From this point, the route generally travels in a northward to northeast direction before terminating at US 82 in Union Springs.

Major intersections

References

223
Transportation in Pike County, Alabama
Transportation in Bullock County, Alabama